Elston House, in Talladega County, Alabama, was built in 1834.  It was listed on the National Register of Historic Places in 1976.  It has also been known as Barta House.

It is Georgian in style.

It is located about { north of Talladega on Turner's Mill Rd.

References

National Register of Historic Places in Talladega County, Alabama
Georgian architecture in Alabama
Houses completed in 1834